Shah & Anchor Kutchhi Engineering College is an engineering college in Mumbai affiliated under University Of Mumbai. 
The college offers technical education to students.
This college was established by the Mahavir Education Trust in 1985, making it one of the oldest technical institutes in the state.

The college has been graded 'A' By NAAC for 5 years from 2021. Computer Engineering and Information Technology branches are accredited By NBA.

Shah and Anchor Kutchhi Engineering college was place in band 251- 300 band in NIRF 2020

History
In 1983 the Mahavir Education Trust was established.

The Bachelor of Engineering course offered by the University of Mumbai. Institute establishing a strong brand image for itself in the engineering domain. The funds for the development of the Engineering College are being augmented by donation from many other philanthropic business and industrialists.
The Engineering College is run by the Mahavir Education Trust established for development of appropriate education in technical field.

Environment
Shah & Anchor Kutchhi Engineering College is located on Waman Tukaram Patil Marg, Chembur, Nearest railway station is Govandi. Deonar Bus Depot on Mumbai- Pune Highway is within walking distance.
All laboratories, class rooms, drawing hall, students room, sports hall, administrative office are situated in a seven-storeyed building of the college.

Courses

Bachelor of Engineering (B.E.)

Departments 
The college has an intake capacity of 600 students in three branches for Bachelor of Engineering degree:
 Electronics and Computer Science Engineering – 120 seats 
 Computer Engineering – 180 seats 
 Information Technology – 120 seats 
 Electronics and telecommunications – 60 seats (started from 2012) 
Artificial Intelligence and Data Science - 60 seats ( Started from 2020) 
Cyber Security - 60 seats ( Started from 2020)
In addition to these, 10% of intake of every branch diploma students are admitted each year during the second year of the bachelor's degree.

Infrastructure and Facilities 
The college has furnished classrooms. Most classrooms have a capacity of around 75 seats, while with some larger classrooms with nearly double capacity.
The college has an auditorium that seats 120. There is also an Engineering Drawing hall.

The college has a library with reading hall, a collection of books related to the curriculum and a few books related to self-improvement and personality development. The college library subscribes to a number of National and International Journals devoted to technical subjects to help students keep themselves updated with latest developments. The college is also a member of IEL Online where IEEE journals can be accessed. Web browsing facilities are also available in the library.
The library has university prescribed text books and reference material. It subscribes to all major international journals and magazines. The library is open six days a week, and on Sundays when exams are approaching.

Canara Bank extension counter has been provided for exclusive use by the staff and students of the college and polytechnic.
The in-house canteen provides a variety of food items.
A gymkhana with facilities for Table Tennis, Carrom and Chess has been provided.

Master of Engineering (M.E.) 
Master of Engineering section in Shah and Anchor was affiliated by Mumbai University in the year 2011.

 Electronics Engineering – 9 seats  
Computer Engineering - 9 seats 
Information Technology - 9 seats

Student life
Lectures and Practicals are mainly conducted between 9.15am and 5.00pm, with an occasional early extra class. Most students engage in various technical, cultural and athletic extra-curricular activities. The expansive lobby is a hub of activity in the time the college is active, and the gymkhana often remains open after hours.
There is a canteen located behind the Diploma section as well as two food stalls by another side gate that serve a variety of refreshments. The grounds behind the college also sees a lot of activity during the lunch breaks and during sports season.
Most students have joined one of the three main organizations pervasive in the college. These organizations are involved in a series of workshops and seminars that the students themselves conduct. The organizations have been detailed below.

These three student organizations are the main source of extracurricular and technical activities hosted by the college.

Institute of Electrical and Electronics Engineers
IEEE-SAKEC is the student chapter of the Institute of Electrical and Electronics Engineers. It helps organize Nucleus, an annual intercollegiate technical symposium. It is the most active student body in the whole Bombay Section.  Apart from organizing events in the college like international university fairs, technical and non-technical seminars and workshops, it organizes a yearly industrial visit to parts of the country. IEEE-SAKEC is a big milestone of this college.

Indian Society for Technical Education
ISTE-SAKEC is the student chapter of the Indian Society for Technical Education, established in 2005. It organizes workshops, seminars and field trips. It helps organize Nucleus, the annual intercollegiate technical symposium.

Computer Society of India
CSI-SAKEC is the student chapter of the Computer Society of India. It conducts workshops during holidays for SAKEC students. The students started a CSI website and CSI magazine, Cache in March 2010.

Institute of Electronics and Telecommunication Engineers
IETE-SAKEC is the student chapter of the Institute of Electronics and Telecommunication Engineers. The IETE SAKEC has been instrumental in bringing all the students of the college in the Electronics and telecommunication branch closer and making shah and anchor a closely knit family. It is a new organization and was made famous for its classy opening ceremony, wherein the inauguration of the organization's name (IETE-SAKEC) was done by the chairman with the help of a remote controlled curtain raiser. This is just the beginning of the many more events that would be conducted successfully by the newly christened student organisation.

Festivals
The college holds multiple events in its annual festival. They are broadly classified into six categories: Nucleus (the technical fest), R1 (national level robotics), Verve (the cultural fest), Marathon, Olympus (comprising all sports based events) and Portal.

Nucleus 
Nucleus is the annual technical symposium of the college. It is jointly organised by the student bodies and the college student council. Companies like HP, Videocon, Bank of Baroda, Samsonite, Charagh Din, MTNL and Asian Paints are associated with it. It covers 50 colleges with more than 3000 students coming from all the parts of the city. Nucleus is SAKEC's annual technical festival promoting technical events and contests for all Mumbai University students. It aims to provide a platform for students to come out of their usual syllabus and experience practical knowledge.

Nucleus hosts the following events:

Technical: The technical events are widely ranged, from coding competitions, events involving practical and interdisciplinary knowledge and various contests that explore creativity and curiosity among students.

Non-technical: There are also a variety of non-technical events associated with the festival. The prominent ones include contests that encourage lateral thinking. There is also a Minute to Win it based contest as well as a gaming contest. Simulation events include handling a virtual IPL team and getting placed via interview.

Robotics: The robotics based events are one of the most prominent features of the technical fest. Together, the events incorporate challenges for the first three levels of robotics.

Challenges include robots playing football, Pacman, maneuvering through various themed courses, remote maze navigation, autonomous line following as well as a robot battle and many others.

R1 
R1 is a national-level robotics event held annually in the college grounds. Sponsored by the memorial trust of the late student Monish Gala, it consists of racing events. The first edition of this event was held in 2009, and was conceived and organized by Monish. A dirt race consisting of both wired and wireless Internal combustion engine robotic cars is held at the college ground. Being a national level event, this event sees participation from engineering students all over India.

Verve 
Verve is the annual inter-collegian cultural festival of the college. It hosts events of widely varied genres.

Harmonix: One of the main attractions of verve, Harmonix  is a musical competition among student bands from across the city. Every year, prominent local bands are also invited to play in the event.

Nrityanjali: Nrityanjali  is an inter-college dance competition.

Model United Nations: SakecMUN  is one of the few Model United Nations being hosted among Mumbai's schools and colleges.

Intra Events: A variety of miscellaneous intra-college events take place, such as a fashion show  and The Apprentice.

Marathon 
The SAKEC Marathon began as an event held during the 2010 college festival, and has been repeated annually. Students from all over the city compete in running a mile through the roads of Chembur. This has become a key event of the SAKEC festival. The SAKEC Marathon began as an event marked to commemorate the 25th anniversary of the college, and was held during the 2010 college festival.

Olympus 
Olympus is the annual sports festival. Intercollegiate events range from football and table tennis to chess and Carrom. More than 60 teams from engineering and medical colleges participate in Olympus. Inter-college competitions started in 2009 and have expanded since. Intra-Olympus too consists of a variety of sports and games ranging from outdoor games like Cricket, football and volleyball to indoor games like chess and Carrom.

Web portal 
Nucleus also hosts a variety of web-based games and events that require on-line participation. These include Google Whack, CodeChef competitions, Web Hunt and Virtual Stock Exchange.

Campus recruitment
Recruiters include consulting, engineering and software development firms. Major recruiters include Tata Consultancy Services, Mastek, Wipro, Syntel, iGATE, Blue Star Infotech, Amdocs, Oracle Financial Services Software (Previously
iFlex), Indus Valley Partners, Mphasis, Larsen & Toubro Infotech, Capgemini, Tech Mahindra, Accenture, GE Energy,  Vistaar, Webaroo (Now SMS GupShup),Godrej infotech.

See also
University of Mumbai
List of Mumbai Colleges

References

External links
Official website

Engineering colleges in Mumbai
Affiliates of the University of Mumbai
Educational institutions established in 1985
1985 establishments in Maharashtra